Cingulum, from the Latin for belt or girdle, may refer to:

 Cingulum (brain), white matter fibers found in the brain
 Cingulum (tooth), a shelf at the margin of a tooth
 A type of groove encircling the theca of dinoflagellates
 Cingulum (Catholicism), a rope belt used by monastic order such as the Order of Saint John (Bailiwick of Brandenburg)
 Cingulum (Wicca), a ritual cord used in British traditional Wicca
 Cingulum militare, Ancient Roman belts decorated with metal fittings worn as a badge of rank by soldiers and officials
 Ancient Roman town on the site of what is now the Italian town of Cingoli.
Shoulder girdle or pectoral girdle